Leslie Oswald Sheridan Poidevin (5 November 1876 – 19 November 1931) was an Australian tennis player and first-class cricketer who played for New South Wales and Lancashire.

Biography
A right-handed batsman who was strong in defence, Poidevin started his first class cricket career with New South Wales in 1895. In 1901 he contributed an unbeaten 140 out of the team's total of 918 runs which was a record team score at the time. He would only bat in 23 innings for NSW over the course of his career but his average of 57.73 ranks favourably with the finest who have played for the state. In the 1901–02 Ashes series, Poidevin was the twelfth man for the first Test match. He was scheduled to make his Test debut in the second Test match, but suffered a finger injury prior to the game.

At the turn of the century he came to England to study medicine and began playing cricket for London County. After three seasons with London County he qualified to play for Lancashire and helped them to win the championship in 1904, his debut season with the county. During the season he made 865 runs at 34. He topped Lancashire's averages the following year with 44 after managing a total of 1376 runs.

Poidevin also played international tennis, representing Australasia in the 1906 Davis Cup as well as in Grand Slams (though missing the 1908 Summer Olympics because of administrative bungling).

Poidevin died on 19 November 1931 at Waverley, New South Wales, Australia. His parents were Napoleon R and Emma Poidevin. 
He was survived by his wife, Isabel Marianne Poidevin (née Barns), and his two children, Gwen and Les.
He was buried in the South Head Cemetery, Old South Head Road, Vaucluse, New South Wales on Friday, 20 November 1931, following a funeral attended by a large number of cricket and tennis representatives and personal friends.

See also
 List of New South Wales representative cricketers

Notes

External links
Cricinfo profile
Australian Dictionary of Biography entry

1876 births
1931 deaths
Australian cricketers
Australian expatriate cricketers in the United Kingdom
Australian expatriate sportspeople in England
Australian people of French descent
Australian male tennis players
Lancashire cricketers
New South Wales cricketers
Tennis people from New South Wales
Gentlemen cricketers
Gentlemen of England cricketers
London County cricketers
Cricketers from New South Wales
H. D. G. Leveson Gower's XI cricketers
W. G. Grace's XI cricketers